Zefiryn Machalla (August 1, 1915 – January 10, 1952), was a major of the Polish Army and participant of the Polish September Campaign. In the interbellum period, his talent was highly praised by the Polish Army Headquarters, for his outstanding bravery, Machalla was nominated for the Virtuti Militari cross.

In late 1939, after Polish defeat, Machalla was captured by the NKVD and sent to Siberia. Two years later, he managed to reach the Anders Army and then, together with the whole army, fought the Germans in Italy.

After World War II, Machalla, unlike most of his fellow soldiers, decided to return to the communist-controlled Poland. In late 1940s he was sentenced by communist judge Stefan Michnik to death for alleged spying. He was not allowed to have a lawyer and was executed on January 10, 1952. His wife found out about the execution a few years later.

Sources
The Institut of National Remembrance, media view, 20.02.2007
 info at Adam Mickiewicz University in Posen

1915 births
1952 deaths
Polish military personnel of World War II
Nonpersons in the Eastern Bloc
People executed by the Polish People's Republic
Executed military personnel
Executed Polish people
Polish deportees to Soviet Union
Polish people detained by the NKVD
Foreign Gulag detainees